Cheranand Savetanand (born October 25, 1941) is a Thai doctor and beauty queen who was Miss Thailand and second runner-up to Miss Universe 1966.

Miss Thailand 1965
Savetanand is the daughter of Police Major General "Jaroong" and Aramsri Savetanand. She was the 1965 winner of the Miss Thailand beauty contest held in Bangkok, Thailand. She graduated from United Kingdom. Like her predecessor, she received training from the Queen Sirikit before competing.

Miss Universe 1966
She was crowned Miss Thailand 1965 on December 3, 1965.  She then went on to compete at the 1966 Miss Universe pageant held in Miami Beach, Florida where she placed second runner-up to Margareta Arvidsson of Sweden who was crowned Miss Universe 1966.

Life after Miss Thailand
In 1969, she married Rungthum Ladplee, surgical doctor of Siriraj Hospital.

References

1941 births
Living people
Cheranand Savetanand
Miss Universe 1966 contestants
Cheranand Savetanand
Cheranand Savetanand